The sixth season of Bad Girls Club is titled Bad Girls Club: Hollywood and premiered on January 10, 2011, on Oxygen. Season 6 was nominated for "Favorite Reality-Show Guilty Pleasure" for the second annual IVillageawards.

Production 
Unlike previous seasons where a half-a-year break in production occurred between seasons, the sixth installment was shot several months after Bad Girls Club: Miami was completed. Casting for the sixth season was done simultaneously after production of Bad Girls Club: Miami was completed. Season six debuted with 1.71 million viewers, up from 25% from last season which earned 1.34 million viewers. One-on-one interviews, with Bunim/Murray Productions, were an option from eligible applicants, who needed to include their email, full name, phone number, and a brief biography telling the casting productions what makes them a "bad girl". Applicants were also told to include two recent photos of themselves before submissions, or otherwise the application wouldn't be accepted. The minimum age to apply was 21. Bunim/Murray Productions were also recruiting on Facebook and MySpace, along with a five-minute casting tape to Bunim-Murray Productions. Production of season six began in October 2010 in Sherman Oaks, California. The tour of season six's mansion was released for public viewing on December 15, 2010, while Oxygen changed their website's homepage for the upcoming season of the Bad Girls Club. The tour of the house was hosted by Steve Leonhardt, the Bad Girls Club production designer, and several days prior to the arrival of the cast of season six, in September 2010.

Controversy 

During production of season six, residents from Sherman Oaks complained that noise levels and swearing was extremely unbearable and inappropriate for them and their children to listen to during the night.  Residents from Ocean Beach called local enforcements four to five times to defused the corruptions, the girls were showcasing, in the middle of the night. A local Ocean Beach resident complained that she has a six-year-old son and didn't want him to listen to the swearing, she went as far as creating a petition drive to ban all production companies in the Ocean Beach hills. Location managers and production crew declined to discuss the neighbors complaints. The Bad Girls Club permit announced that the entire production was to abide the "minimum outdoor activity noise" rule, whereas, neighbors state otherwise that the show did not keep noise levels at a low range.

House 
The tour of season six's mansion was released for public viewing on December 15, 2010, while Oxygen changed their website's homepage for the upcoming season of the Bad Girls Club. The tour of the house was hosted by Steve Leonhardt, the Bad Girls Club production designer, and several days prior to the arrival of the cast of season six, in September 2010. Located in Sherman Oaks, California, season 6's mansion was nearly six miles away from city streets whereas the mansion was nearly three and a half miles away from Pier 39. The girls are welcomed with a medium bachelor pad-styled house with centric add-ons in front of the doorway, signifying a Hollywood mansion. The two-divided country western doors have only one small star-shaped see-through window that are located adjacent to the door knob. The girls are then welcomed with eco-friendly potted plants and dark purple walls that are populated with comments and ratings from major media coverage. Down across the same hallway is a hang-out room that has a circular hot pink couch, which the girls can encounter. Facing towards the hang out room the girls can spot a replica of the Hollywood sign reading "Bad Girls Club". Also located near the hang out room is a bigger size living room which features more bright colors and modern matching furniture that faces bright stars at a dark-colored wall. Above the staircase, the girls can spot a stripperposing adjacent to the Bad Girls Club logo. Scattered across the wall, near the staircase, are pictures of the ladies from Bad Girls Club: Miami, which was the previous season. The production designer decided to upgrade the mansion from previous house styles and gave the girls the Hollywood scene look, stating that the girls of Bad Girls Club are celebrities.

The Bad Girls Club creed became the pigment on one of the main walls in the foyer nearly twenty-four feet tall, which was done for the first time. In previous seasons, the creed was only framed above the fireplace. Leonhardt believed that the creed broke the Guinness Book of World Records for the tallest creed in history. The pool in use was decorated as an indoor pond by placing waterfalls and potted plants around the pool and Jacuzzi, similar to Bad Girls Club season 4's pool. The balcony used was smaller compared from season's four and five, which had used a cabana. Season 6 used a hothouse and applied relaxation beds. Inside the house, producers used neon lights to flash "Bitch" in a star and placing, at the end, "fake" and "real". In seasons past, the Bad Girls had pictures of themselves which they could interact with, which was first introduced in season 3. Season 6 used picture monitors for the girls to express themselves. The girls were also given an indoor Jacuzzi in the dining room to give them more purpose to be in the dining room which producers stated that the girls never interacted in there and wanted to change that for season 6. The dining room expressed pink and black colors which represented a 1950s look. Beyond the dining room, the game room, which features a bar, Ping-Pong table, pool table, murals on the walls, and the BG Spot which became the processor of the "Screaming-O vending machine". In the phone room, producers used classic style black and white photos of Melrose Avenue. Due to the popularity of the exercise equipment, the girls were given an exercise room which had available equipment that they can use to defuse their anger or work out.

The girls were also given a modern kitchen that had pink lights above the stove instead of the white lights that are used in American homes. The girls' rooms were entirely of lime green, baby blue twin beds, and lent king-size beds. The make-up room for season 6 had more mirrors and seating than previous seasons. Throughout the entire house, all seven girls are only given one walk-in closet. In the make-up room there are two, two-way mirrors, which the girls do not know about and believe that it is a private mirror.

Cast 
The season began with seven original bad girls, of which two left voluntarily and one was removed by production. Three replacement bad girls were introduced in their absences later in the season.

Duration of Cast

Episodes

Nominations

Notes

References 

Bad Girls Club seasons
2011 American television seasons
Television shows set in Los Angeles